Jaime Andrés Vera Rodríguez (born 25 March 1963) is a former Chilean footballer and current manager.

Club career
Vera began his professional career in Chile with Colo-Colo, before spending five seasons with OFI in the Greek Super League. He also had a spell with Atlético Morelia in the Primera Division de Mexico.

He is the second Chilean to play for OFI Crete after Alejandro Hisis and before Miguel Vargas and Felipe Gallegos.

International career
Vera made several appearances for the senior Chile national football team, including appearing at the 1987, 1989 and 1991 Copa América.

Vera also played for Chile at the 1984 Olympic Games in Los Angeles.

Honours

As Player 
Colo-Colo
 Primera División de Chile (3): 1981, 1983, 1986
 Copa Chile (3): 1981, 1983, 1985

Cobreloa
 Primera División de Chile (1): 1992

As Manager 
Deportes Iquique
 Copa Chile (1): 2013–14

References

External links
 
 
 

1963 births
Living people
Footballers from Santiago
Chilean footballers
Chilean expatriate footballers
Chile international footballers
1987 Copa América players
1989 Copa América players
1991 Copa América players
Footballers at the 1984 Summer Olympics
Olympic footballers of Chile
Colo-Colo footballers
OFI Crete F.C. players
Cobreloa footballers
Atlético Morelia players
Chilean Primera División players
Super League Greece players
Liga MX players
Expatriate footballers in Greece
Chilean expatriate sportspeople in Greece
Expatriate footballers in Mexico
Chilean expatriate sportspeople in Mexico
Association football midfielders
Chilean football managers
Ñublense managers
Deportes Puerto Montt managers
Universidad de Concepción managers
Chile national football team managers
Deportes Iquique managers
Deportes Antofagasta managers
Curicó Unido managers
OFI Crete F.C. managers
Deportes Melipilla managers
Primera B de Chile managers
Chilean Primera División managers
Super League Greece managers
Chilean expatriate football managers
Expatriate football managers in Greece